The 48th General Assembly of Nova Scotia represented Nova Scotia between 1963 and April 20, 1967.

Division of seats

There were 43 members of the General Assembly, elected in the 1963 Nova Scotia general election.

List of members

References 

Terms of the General Assembly of Nova Scotia
1963 establishments in Nova Scotia
1967 disestablishments in Nova Scotia
20th century in Nova Scotia